Qila-e-Ark is a palace fort in Aurangabad, Maharashtra, India, built by the sixth mughal emperor Aurangzeb Alamgir in 1650. The palace fort was denotified from the state archeological department in 1971.
The palace was used as a government college during the Nizam's period, later the college was shifted. And since the denotification, the palace is in ruins. The palace has many notable buildings namely Zenana mahal or Zebunnisa Mahal, Mardana mahal, Durbar, Aurangzeb's Mosque.

since years several organizations and experts have been suggesting that the palace can be restored and be opened to the public which will revive the palace and the tourism industry. Many organizations in Aurangabad are organizing heritage walks in the qila e ark to spread awareness about the monument.

List of gates

Palace complex

References

Palaces in Maharashtra
Aurangabad, Maharashtra
History of Maharashtra
History of India
Mughal architecture